St. Antony Church, Sundampatti is catholic church lies on Krishnagiri-Chennai NH-48 in Sundampatti village, Krishnagiri district, Tamil Nadu. This located 5 KM away from the district capital Krishnagiri. This church is famous around the neighboring villages for every Tuesday evening mass. This parish has 194 families with the members of 628. There are 9  Ambiyams serving under this parish.

History

In 2-5-1937, Philip son of Susaiappan-Gnanamary who belongs to Sundampatti's family got baptized at Elthagiri Adaikala Madha Church. Later, many Catholic settlements were established in Sundampatti. This record shows that the Catholic settlement in Sundampatti took place between 1930 and 1940.

Parish priest Fr Mathew observed that the Catholic population has increased in Sundampatti, so he purchased 0.45 acres in the village's north side. Villagers remembering that open-air  mass was conducted here by Salem bishop Rev. Venmani Selvanathan in 1963. Currently, this area is a graveyard, with a small chapel in the middle.

In 1969, Elathagiri parish priest Fr. Ignatius Kalathil purchased 0.92 cents of land along the highway in this village, where he built a chapel and conducted services every Sunday. Fr. Joachim, Elathagiri's next parish priest, began the construction of a church in 1978. On 16-Jan-1979, the church was completed and services began. During that time  masses will conducted every Tuesday evening and every Sunday morning by the Elathagiri Parish priest.

A Vannathu Chinappar church was built by Elathagiri Parish priest Fr. Amalraj in the nearby village Soorankottai during 1993 for the catholics in that area. Fr. Amalraj, who built the St. Antony church tower in 1994, built it to provide a good view from the road. Unfortunately, this tower was demolished in 2004 to make way for a road expansion. This in 2005 this tower was rebuilt.

It was announced on 2-6-1998 that Sundampatti will become a Parish and this church will become the parish church. Meanwhile, Soorankottai will become the sub-station church for Sundampatti. Since the priest house was built behind this church in 1999, the Capuchin Fathers  have been conducting the holy services in this church. In 1999, Franciscan Sisters of St. Thomas (FST Sisters)  also began their service in this church.

In 2013, the Jesuits congregation of Dharmapuri diocese took over the parish from Capuchin's, then after Rev. Fr. Xavier became the parish priest. During his tenure this church was expanded with the help of donations. Then renovated church was opened for services in 24-5-2015 with the blessing of Bishop Lawrence Pius of Dharmapuri diocese.

The Capuchin congregation is still operating in Sundampatti for The Fountain Capuchin Institute of Counseling, Psychotherapy and Research, which is located back side of the church. Meanwhile still Capuchin priest are supporting in additional holy service by conditioning masses in this church.

Furthermore, this church has provided holy services for more than 80 years, and almost 160 families are now part of this church.

See also
Roman Catholic Diocese of Dharmapuri
Vinnarasi Madha Church, Kandikuppam
Our Lady Of Refuge Church, Elathagiri
Sundampatti, Krishnagiri district
Our Lady of Fatima Church, Krishnagiri

References

Churches in Krishnagiri District
Roman Catholic churches in Tamil Nadu